Vedangi Kulkarni (born 1998) is an Indian endurance cyclist. In 2018 at the age of 20, she became the youngest woman to cycle the globe.

Biography 
Kulkarni comes from Pune, India. She studies sports management at Bournemouth University, United Kingdom.

Record attempt 
Preparations for the record attempt began in 2016. The journey began in Perth, Australia in June 2018 and ended in Kolkata, India. It involved cycling a total of 29,000 km in 159 days, pedalling over 300 km a day, spanning 14 countries. Some hurdles she faced along the journey involved being chased by a grizzly bear in Canada, camping alone for multiple nights in the Russian snow, and being robbed at knife-point in Spain. She did not have anyone accompanying her for 80 percent of the journey. Kulkarni encountered temperatures ranging from -20 degrees Celsius to  37 degrees Celsius.

References 

Living people
Ultra-distance cyclists
People from Pune
Indian female cyclists
1998 births
Solo female touring cyclists